Events in the year 1971 in Syria.

Incumbent

Events

March 

 22 March: 1971 Syrian presidential election

September 

 1 September: 1971 Syrian Federation of Arab Republics referendum

Sport 

 Syria at the 1971 Mediterranean Games

References

See also 

 
1970s in Syria
Years of the 20th century in Syria
Syria
Syria